This list of comedy clubs in the United States features notable venues for comedy performances including stand-up, improv and sketch theatres.

Comedy clubs

Defunct venues
 All Jokes Aside, Chicago
 Cabaret Concert Theatre, Los Angeles
 Comedy Workshop, Houston
 Comix NY, Manhattan
 Dangerfield's, Manhattan
 Friars Club of Beverly Hills
 Holy City Zoo, San Francisco
 The Laff Stop, Houston
 San Francisco Comedy Condo

See also
 :Category:American comedy troupes
 :Category:Comedy festivals in the United States

References
 Entertainers Resource Directory: USA Comedy Clubs

 
Comedy clubs in the United States